Caldew School is a coeducational secondary school and sixth form located in the Village of Dalston in Cumbria, England.

The school educates just over a thousand pupils including Sixth Form, with around one hundred teaching staff. The school's logo is an image of a cockerel, which is also used by the village of Dalston. The school's motto is 'aspire, believe, achieve.' It used to be 'While I live, I crow'. Caldew pupils take part in activities competing with pupils from other schools in the county in sports such as football, rugby and cross country running.

Caldew School converted to academy status on 1 August 2011.

Achievements
In 2013, Caldew was given a grade of "good" from Ofsted, the English education watchdog.  This was an improvement from the "satisfactory" it received the year before. Inspectors from Ofsted said Caldew's leaders have "pursued improvements with great determination."

In July 2009, Caldew celebrated its 50th anniversary. It was founded in 1959, with a total of 300 students.

Results
In 2016, all pupils sitting exams left the school with five GCSE passes or more.

Former students
Former pupils include Fishboy, journalist Grace Dent, her comic genius younger brother David (Room 4), whom, if he'd actually have frequented the site a little more often: taking time to read and write and spell, would have far surpassed his more famous sister's achievements, and the poet Jacob Polley and William Stobart of the Stobart Group.

References

External links
 Caldew School Website

Secondary schools in Cumbria
Academies in Cumbria
Dalston, Cumbria